Navala is a village in the Ba Highlands of northern-central, Fiji. It is noted for its thatched buildings, amounting to over 200. It is one of the few settlements in Fiji which remains fully traditional architecturally. Navala is actually three settlements put together. It is protected by mountains and ridges. Navala is on the other side of a river. The river floods often and is the main reason for Navala's isolation from the other towns. It is also a popular tourist site. Navala is very special because all their houses are the same size. All the bures have a metal post also known as a Bou (in Fijian). Bous are mostly placed in a chief's house. This shows Navala's equality, and is one reason why Navala is a special village.

References

Populated places in Fiji
Viti Levu
Ba Province